Anacortes Airport  is a public use airport located two nautical miles (3.7 km) west of the central business district of Anacortes, a city in Skagit County, Washington, United States. It is owned by the Port of Anacortes.

It is included in the Federal Aviation Administration (FAA) National Plan of Integrated Airport Systems for 2017–2021, in which it is categorized as a local general aviation facility.

Facilities and aircraft 
It has one runway designated 18/36 with an asphalt surface measuring 3,015 by 60 feet (919 x 18 m).

For the 12-month period ending July 31, 2014, the airport had 9,000 aircraft operations, an average of 25 per day: 73% general aviation and 17% air taxi. In July 2017, there were 55 aircraft based at this airport: 53 single-engine, 1 jet, and 1 helicopter.

Airline and destinations

References

External links 
 Port of Anacortes: Airport Page
 Anacortes Airport at Washington State DOT

 Anacortes Airport in the news:
 To sell or not to sell Anacortes Airport? - Skagit Valley Herald, 12-Sep-2005
 Port approves airport vote - Anacortes American Online, 21-Sep-2005
 FAA blasts airport sale idea - Anacortes American Online, 5-Oct-2005
 AOPA weighs in to keep Washington airport open - AOPA Online, 11-Oct-2005
 Anacortes Airport Supporters Win Pivotal Port Commission Seats - Airport Journals, December 2005

Airports in Washington (state)
Transportation buildings and structures in Skagit County, Washington
Airport
Airports with year of establishment missing